In geometry, an Archimedean solid is one of the 13 solids first enumerated by Archimedes.  They are the convex uniform polyhedra composed of regular polygons meeting in identical vertices, excluding the five Platonic solids (which are composed of only one type of polygon), excluding the prisms and antiprisms, and excluding the pseudorhombicuboctahedron. They are a subset of the Johnson solids, whose regular polygonal faces do not need to meet in identical vertices.

"Identical vertices" means that each two vertices are symmetric to each other: A global isometry of the entire solid takes one vertex to the other while laying the solid directly on its initial position.  observed that a 14th polyhedron, the elongated square gyrobicupola (or pseudo-rhombicuboctahedron), meets a weaker definition of an Archimedean solid, in which "identical vertices" means merely that the faces surrounding each vertex are of the same types (i.e. each vertex looks the same from close up), so only a local isometry is required. Grünbaum pointed out a frequent error in which authors define Archimedean solids using this local definition but omit the 14th polyhedron. If only 13 polyhedra are to be listed, the definition must use global symmetries of the polyhedron rather than local neighborhoods.

Prisms and antiprisms, whose symmetry groups are the dihedral groups, are generally not considered to be Archimedean solids, even though their faces are regular polygons and their symmetry groups act transitively on their vertices. Excluding these two infinite families, there are 13 Archimedean solids. All the Archimedean solids (but not the elongated square gyrobicupola) can be made via Wythoff constructions from the Platonic solids with tetrahedral, octahedral and icosahedral symmetry.

Origin of name
The Archimedean solids take their name from Archimedes, who discussed them in a now-lost work. Pappus refers to it, stating that Archimedes listed 13 polyhedra. During the Renaissance, artists and mathematicians valued pure forms with high symmetry, and by around 1620 Johannes Kepler had completed the rediscovery of the 13 polyhedra, as well as defining the prisms, antiprisms, and the non-convex solids known as Kepler-Poinsot polyhedra. (See  for more information about the rediscovery of the Archimedean solids during the renaissance.)

Kepler may have also found the elongated square gyrobicupola (pseudorhombicuboctahedron): at least, he once stated that there were 14 Archimedean solids. However, his published enumeration only includes the 13 uniform polyhedra, and the first clear statement of the pseudorhombicuboctahedron's existence was made in 1905, by Duncan Sommerville.

Classification
There are 13 Archimedean solids (not counting the elongated square gyrobicupola; 15 if the mirror images of two enantiomorphs, the snub cube and snub dodecahedron, are counted separately).

Here the vertex configuration refers to the type of regular polygons that meet at any given vertex. For example, a vertex configuration of 4.6.8 means that a square, hexagon, and octagon meet at a vertex (with the order taken to be clockwise around the vertex).

Some definitions of Semiregular polyhedron include one more figure, the Elongated square gyrobicupola or "pseudo-rhombicuboctahedron".

Properties 

The number of vertices is 720° divided by the vertex angle defect.

The cuboctahedron and icosidodecahedron are edge-uniform and are called quasi-regular.

The duals of the Archimedean solids are called the Catalan solids.  Together with the bipyramids and trapezohedra, these are the face-uniform solids with regular vertices.

Chirality 

The snub cube and snub dodecahedron are known as chiral, as they come in a left-handed form (Latin: levomorph or laevomorph) and right-handed form (Latin: dextromorph). When something comes in multiple forms which are each other's three-dimensional mirror image, these forms may be called enantiomorphs.  (This nomenclature is also used for the forms of certain chemical compounds.)

Construction of Archimedean solids 

The different Archimedean and Platonic solids can be related to each other using a handful of general constructions.  Starting with a Platonic solid, truncation involves cutting away of corners.  To preserve symmetry, the cut is in a plane perpendicular to the line joining a corner to the center of the polyhedron and is the same for all corners.  Depending on how much is truncated (see table below), different Platonic and Archimedean (and other) solids can be created. If the truncation is exactly deep enough such that each pair of faces from adjacent vertices shares exactly one point, it is known as a rectification. An expansion, or cantellation, involves moving each face away from the center (by the same distance so as to preserve the symmetry of the Platonic solid) and taking the convex hull.  Expansion with twisting also involves rotating the faces, thus splitting each rectangle corresponding to an edge into two triangles by one of the diagonals of the rectangle.  The last construction we use here is truncation of both corners and edges.  Ignoring scaling, expansion can also be viewed as the rectification of the rectification. Likewise, the cantitruncation can be viewed as the truncation of the rectification.

Note the duality between the cube and the octahedron, and between the dodecahedron and the icosahedron. Also, partially because the tetrahedron is self-dual, only one Archimedean solid that has at most tetrahedral symmetry. (All Platonic solids have at least tetrahedral symmetry, as tetrahedral symmetry is a symmetry operation of (i.e. is included in) octahedral and isohedral symmetries, which is demonstrated by the fact that an octahedron can be viewed as a rectified tetrahedron, and an icosahedron can be used as a snub tetrahedron.)

Stereographic projection

See also 
 Aperiodic tiling
 Archimedean graph
 Icosahedral twins
 List of uniform polyhedra
 Prince Rupert's cube#Generalizations
 Quasicrystal
 Regular polyhedron
 Semiregular polyhedron
 Toroidal polyhedron
 Uniform polyhedron

Citations

Works cited 
.
.

General references 
.
  Chapter 2
  (Section 3–9)
.

External links
 
 Archimedean Solids by Eric W. Weisstein, Wolfram Demonstrations Project.
 Paper models of Archimedean Solids and Catalan Solids
 Free paper models(nets) of Archimedean solids
 The Uniform Polyhedra by Dr. R. Mäder
 Archimedean Solids at Visual Polyhedra by David I. McCooey
 Virtual Reality Polyhedra, The Encyclopedia of Polyhedra by George W. Hart
 Penultimate Modular Origami by James S. Plank
 Interactive 3D polyhedra in Java
 Solid Body Viewer is an interactive 3D polyhedron viewer which allows you to save the model in svg, stl or obj format.
 Stella: Polyhedron Navigator: Software used to create many of the images on this page.
 Paper Models of Archimedean (and other) Polyhedra